Padre nuestro is a 2005 Chilean film directed by Rodrigo Sepúlveda. It was Chile's submission to the 80th Academy Awards for the Academy Award for Best Foreign Language Film, but was not selected as a nominee. The film had its release in October 2005, at the Viña del Mar Film Festival. Its theatrically release came a year later, in October 2006.

Plot 
"Children, please get me out of here." That was the last wish of Caco, a hardened womanizer who had abandoned his family 9 years ago, to his children Pedro, Meche, and Roberto while spending his last day in a hospital in Valparaíso. They had no idea that this fun-loving, cheerful, and eccentric old man would do everything in his power to reunite his family, even if it meant sacrificing his life.

See also

List of submissions to the 80th Academy Awards for Best Foreign Language Film

References

External links
 

2005 films
2000s Spanish-language films
2005 comedy-drama films
Chilean comedy-drama films
2005 comedy films
2005 drama films